Eucyclotoma inquinata is a species of sea snail, a marine gastropod mollusk in the family Raphitomidae.

Description
The length of the shell attains 9 mm.

The shell is spirally ridged and closely longitudinally striated. The sinus is deep. The color of the shell is whitish, stained here and there with orange-brown.

Distribution
This marine species occurs off the Philippines.

References

External links
 

inquinata
Gastropods described in 1845